The Patna–Bhabua Road Intercity Express is an Express train belonging to East Central Railway zone that runs between  and  in India. It is currently being operated with 13243/13244 train numbers on a daily basis.

Service

The 13243/Patna–Bhabua Road InterCity Express  has an average speed of 40 km/hr and covers 243 km in 6h. The 13244/Bhabua Road–Patna InterCity Express Express has an average speed of 42 km/hr and covers 243 km in 5h 45m.

Route and halts 

The important halts of the train are:

Coach composition

The train has standard ICF rakes with max speed of 110 kmph. The train consists of 14 coaches:

 12 General
 2 Seating cum Luggage Rake

Traction

Both trains are hauled by a Mughal Sarai Loco Shed-based WAP-4 electric locomotive from Patna to Bhabua Road and vice versa.

Rake sharing

The trains shares its rake with

 13249/13250 Patna–Bhabua Road Intercity Express
 53213/53214 Patna–Gaya Passenger
 53211/53212 Patna–Sasaram Passenger

See also 

 Patna Junction railway station
 Bhabua Road railway station
 Patna–Bhabua Road Intercity Express
 Patna–Gaya Passenger
 Patna–Sasaram Passenger

Notes

References

External links 

 13243/Patna - Bhabua Road InterCity Express India Rail Info
 13244/Bhabua Road - Patna InterCity Express India Rail Info

Transport in Patna
Intercity Express (Indian Railways) trains
Rail transport in Bihar